Sela is a village in the municipality of Kalinovik, Republika Srpska, Bosnia and Herzegovina.

A high number of medieval tombstones with inscription in Cyrillic was found in Sela, dated to the 15th century.

References

Villages in Republika Srpska
Populated places in Kalinovik